The 2019 Memorial Cup (branded as the 2019 Memorial Cup presented by Kia for sponsorship reasons) was a four-team, round-robin format tournament held at the Scotiabank Centre in Halifax, Nova Scotia from May 17–26, 2019. It was the 101st Memorial Cup championship which determine the champion of the Canadian Hockey League (CHL). The tournament was hosted by the Halifax Mooseheads, who won the right to host the tournament over the Moncton Wildcats. The Rouyn-Noranda Huskies defeated the Halifax Mooseheads to win their first Memorial Cup. Mario Pouliot became the first coach to win consecutive Memorial Cups while leading different teams.

Host bidding process
The Quebec Major Junior Hockey League (QMJHL) considered bids from the Halifax Mooseheads and the Moncton Wildcats to host the 2019 Memorial Cup. The Mooseheads had previously hosted the 2000 Memorial Cup, and proposed to host the event at the Scotiabank Centre in Halifax to coincide with the team's 25th anniversary during the 2018–19 QMJHL season. The Wildcats had previously hosted the 2006 Memorial Cup, and proposed to host the event at the Avenir Centre which completed construction in 2018. On April 5, 2018, the QMJHL announced that the Mooseheads were chosen to host the 2019 event.

Road to the Cup

OHL playoffs

The Guelph Storm won the J. Ross Robertson Cup as the playoffs champions of the Ontario Hockey League (OHL). The Storm defeated the Kitchener Rangers in four consecutive games in the first round, then lost the next three games to the London Knights before rallying with four consecutive victories to win the second round series in seven games. The Storm lost the first two games in both the third round and the finals, but defeated the Saginaw Spirit in seven games and the Ottawa 67's in six games.

QMJHL playoffs

The Rouyn-Noranda Huskies were ranked as the top Canadian Hockey League team for four months during the 2018–19 QMJHL season. The Huskies set a QMJHL record with 59 wins during the season, which included a 25-game winning streak. The Huskies won their second President's Cup as the playoffs champions of the QMJHL.

WHL playoffs

The Prince Albert Raiders won the Ed Chynoweth Cup as the playoffs champions of the Western Hockey League (WHL). The Raiders won the championship series in overtime in the seventh game versus the Vancouver Giants.

Event details

As part of a new sponsorship agreement between the CHL and Kia Motors, the South Korean automaker replaced Mastercard as presenting sponsor of the tournament beginning in 2019.

The Memorial Cup trophy arrived in Halifax aboard HMCS Glace Bay, then was accompanied by players from the Halifax Mooseheads in a parade to the Scotiabank Centre.

Team rosters
Rosters as listed on the Memorial Cup web site for each team:

Halifax Mooseheads
Head coach: Éric Veilleux

Rouyn-Noranda Huskies
Head coach: Mario Pouliot

Guelph Storm
Head coach: George Burnett

Prince Albert Raiders
Head coach: Marc Habscheid

Tournament games
All times local (UTC −3)

Round-robin

Round-robin standings

Semifinal game

Championship game

The Huskies won their first Memorial Cup in franchise history with a victory by a 4–2 score versus the Mooseheads, watched by a sold-out crowd with 10,595 fans. The Mooseheads had led the game a 2–0 score in the second period, then the Huskies scored four consecutive goals for the win. Huskies head coach Mario Pouliot became the first person to win consecutive Memorial Cups with two different teams, and third coach overall to win with multiple teams including, Don Hay and Bryan Maxwell.

Statistical leaders

Skaters

GP = Games played; G = Goals; A = Assists; Pts = Points; PIM = Penalty minutes

GP = Games played; G = Goals; A = Assists; Pts = Points; PIM = Penalty minutes

Goaltenders

GP = Games played; W = Wins; L = Losses; SA = Shots against; GA = Goals against; GAA = Goals against average; SV% = Save percentage; SO = Shutouts; TOI = Time on ice (minutes)

GP = Games played; W = Wins; L = Losses; SA = Shots against; GA = Goals against; GAA = Goals against average; SV% = Save percentage; SO = Shutouts; TOI = Time on ice (minutes:seconds)

Awards
The CHL handed out the following awards at the conclusion of the 2019 Memorial Cup:

 Stafford Smythe Memorial Trophy (Most outstanding player): Joël Teasdale, Rouyn-Noranda Huskies
 Ed Chynoweth Trophy (Top scorer): Jakub Lauko, Rouyn-Noranda Huskies
 George Parsons Trophy (Most sportsmanlike player): Nick Suzuki, Guelph Storm
 Hap Emms Memorial Trophy (Best goaltender): Alexis Gravel, Halifax Mooseheads
 Memorial Cup All-Star Team:
Goaltender: Alexis Gravel, Halifax Mooseheads
Defence: Sean Durzi, Guelph Storm; Noah Dobson, Rouyn-Noranda Huskies
Forwards: Isaac Ratcliffe, Guelph Storm; Félix Bibeau, Rouyn-Noranda Huskies; Benoit-Olivier Groulx, Halifax Mooseheads

References

External links
 Memorial Cup
 Canadian Hockey League

Memorial Cup
Memorial Cup
Memorial Cup tournaments
Ice hockey competitions in Halifax, Nova Scotia
21st century in Halifax, Nova Scotia